Llano Municipal Airport  is two miles northeast of Llano, in Llano County, Texas.

Most U.S. airports use the same three-letter location identifier for the FAA and IATA, but Llano Municipal is AQO to the FAA and has no IATA code. The airport's former FAA identifier was 6R9.

Facilities

In the year ending March 10, 2006 the airport had 11,100 aircraft operations, average 30 per day, all general aviation. 41 aircraft are based at this airport: 90% single-engine, 5% glider and 5% ultralight.

References

External links 
Llano Municipal Airport page at City of Llano website

Airports in Texas
Transportation in Llano County, Texas
Buildings and structures in Llano County, Texas